Marta Zenoni (born 9 March 1999) is an Italian middle distance runner who won six national titles at senior level.

Biography
At international senior level she won silver medal at the 2019 European Team Championships and she also won two bronze medals at international youth level.

Achievements

National titles
Zenoni won six national championships at individual senior level in six different events.
Italian Athletics Championships
800 m: 2015
1500 m: 2019
5000 m: 2019
Italian Cross Country Championships
Short race: 2019
Italian Athletics Indoor Championships
800 m: 2016
1500 m: 2016

References

External links
 

1999 births
Living people
Sportspeople from Bergamo
Italian female middle-distance runners
Italian Athletics Championships winners
Italian female cross country runners
20th-century Italian women
21st-century Italian women